Store Strandstræde 20 is a historic property located at the corner of Store Strandstræde and Lille Strandstræde in central Copenhagen, Denmark. The building was from the early 10th century until 1960 operated as a hotel. It was listed in the Danish registry of protected buildings and places in 1950.

History

18th century
The property was by 1689 as No. 51 in St. Ann's East Quarter (Sankt Annæ Øster Kvarter) owned by one Christen Pedersen's widow. It was by 1756 as No. 111 owned by Icelandic merchant Thomas Balle.

The current building on the site was constructed in  1797–1799 for merchants Hans Kye and Wilhelm Helt.

19th century
The property was in the new cadastre of 1806 listed as No. 78. It was by then owned by Hansen & Chr. Gregersen.

The priest N.F.S. Grundtvig lived in the building for around a month in October–November 1815. His next home was in a now demolished building at Sankt Peders Stræde 14.

The building was later converted into a hotel under the name Stadt Lauenborg. An owner, whose name was Murdoch, purchased a building at the corner of Bredgade and Dronningens Tværgade it in 1837 and converted into another hotel under the name Hotel Stadt Hamburg.

2+th century
The name of the hotel in Store Strandstræde was changed to Hotel Victoria in circa 1900. It closed in 1960.

Architecture
The three-storey building has eight bays towards Store Strandstræde and four bays towards Lille Strandstræde. The avscence of a chamfered corner bay is atypical for buildings constructed immediately after the Copenhagen Fire of 1795 since this was normally a requirement under the new Copenhagen Building Act. The facade on Lille Strandstræde is crowned by a two-bay gabled dormer.

Today
An  antique toys and dolls store is based in the ground floor. The upper floors are offices. Companies based the building include Casa Nord.

References

External links

 Casa Nord

Listed residential buildings in Copenhagen
Commercial buildings completed in 1799